Jokajdon is a genus of small air-breathing land snails, terrestrial pulmonate gastropod mollusks in the family Charopidae.

Species 
Species in the genus Jokajdon include
 Jokajdon callizonus
 Jokajdon tumidulus

References

 Nomenclator Zoologicus info

 
Charopidae
Taxonomy articles created by Polbot